Heerma may refer to:

 Enneüs Heerma Bridge, a bridge in the Netherlands

People with the surname
 Enneüs Heerma (1944–1999), Dutch politician
 Pieter Heerma (born 1977), Dutch politician

See also
 Heermann (disambiguation)

Surnames of Frisian origin